Cerithiopsis micalii is a species of sea snail, a gastropod in the family Cerithiopsidae, which is known from European waters. It was described by Cecalupo and Villari, in 1997.

References

micalii
Gastropods described in 1997